Gerhart Münch (23 March 1907 Dresden – 9 December 1988 
Tacámbaro, Michoacán Mexico) was a German pianist and composer.

Munch faced issues during the 1930s because he refused to join the Nazi party. He was drafted and served in the German military from 1940–1944. In 1947 he emigrated to the United States.

References

External links 
 Gerhart Münch plays Alexander Skrjabin: Sonata No.4, Op.23 Prestissimo volando *

German pianists
1907 births
German military personnel of World War II
German emigrants to the United States
Musicians from Dresden
1988 deaths
20th-century pianists
20th-century German composers